"Say I Yi Yi" is a song by American hip hop group Ying Yang Twins. It is the lead single from their second studio album Alley: The Return of the Ying Yang Twins (2002). The song has been described as an "infectious booty-blessing anthem".

According to the Ying Yang Twins, the song was previously denied by Universal Records, and its release led to them receiving a phone call from Jay-Z, who told them they were "fuckin' up my money". The song became one of their more successful hits following their 2000 single "Whistle While You Twurk", selling 465,000 units in 2002.

Charts

Weekly charts

Year-end charts

References

2002 singles
2002 songs
Ying Yang Twins songs
Songs written by Mr. Collipark